The 2011 National Lacrosse League season, the 25th in the history of the NLL, began January 8, 2011, and ended with the Championship game, won by the Toronto Rock 8-7.

Team movement
The Orlando Titans announced in July 2010 that they would not participate in the 2011 season, due to financial troubles. Some players were granted free agency while others were involved in a dispersal draft.

Final standings

Playoffs

Milestones and events

Pre-season
 July 30, 2010: The league announced that the Orlando Titans would not be participating in the 2011 season.

Regular season
 John Tavares scores the first goal of the game against the Philadelphia Wings at the Wells Fargo Center in a 16–7 win, marking the first player in league history to reach 700 goals scored.
 The following week at home against the same team, Tavares would become the first person to tally 1,500 career points.

Awards

Annual

All-Pro teams
First Team
 Jeff Shattler, Calgary
 Pat McCready, Rochester
 Matt Vinc, Rochester
 Ryan Benesch, Minnesota
 Rhys Duch, Washington
 Dan Dawson, Boston

Second Team
 Lewis Ratcliff, Washington
 John Tavares, Buffalo
 Stephan Leblanc, Toronto
 Brodie Merrill, Edmonton
 Mike Carnegie, Calgary
 Anthony Cosmo, Boston

All-Rookie team
 Curtis Dickson, Calgary
 Cody Jamieson, Rochester
 Kyle Rubisch, Boston
 Aaron Pascas, Toronto
 Andrew Suitor, Minnesota
 Tyler Hass, Minnesota

Weekly awards
The NLL gives out awards weekly for the best overall player, best offensive player, best transition player, best defensive player, and best rookie.

Monthly awards 
Awards are also given out monthly for the best overall player and best rookie.

Statistics leaders
Bold numbers indicate new single-season records. Italics indicate tied single-season records.

See also
 2011 in sports

References

11
National Lacrosse League